The Port Hope Panthers are a junior hockey team based in Port Hope, Ontario, Canada.  They play in the Provincial Junior Hockey League of the Ontario Hockey Association.

History
In 1995, the Trenton Sting made the jump from the Eastern Ontario Junior C Hockey League to the Ontario Provincial Junior A Hockey League.  In their wake, they formed a feeder team that was to be known as the Brighton Buzz.  The Junior C league changed its name to the Empire B Junior C Hockey League just prior to the 1995-96 season to avoid confusion with the Ottawa District Hockey Association's Eastern Ontario Junior C Hockey League.  After two seasons, in 1997 the Brighton Buzz moved and became the Colborne Blackhawks.  The Blackhawks folded mid-season in 1999.  The Sting's feeder team had been an utter disaster as it had only won 16 games in 140 contests over four seasons.

In 2004, Junior hockey came back to the Town of Colborne.  The Empire B league expanded and formed the Colborne Cobras.  Their first season was all about survival as the team finished in dead last.

The 2005-06 season saw the Cobras show some staying power with thirteen wins, despite a fifth-place finish.  They made the playoffs, and in the league quarter-final the Cobras drew the Picton Pirates.  The Cobras defeated the Pirates 3-games-to-2 to win the team's first ever playoff series.  In the league semi-final, the Cobras were swamped by the eventual champion Napanee Raiders 4-games-to-none.

The 2006-07 season was a breakout season for the Colborne Cobras.  With thirty-two wins in thirty-nine games, the Cobras finished in first place overall in the regular season.  In the league semi-final, the Cobras drew the fourth seeded Campbellford Rebels.  The Cobras dispatched the Rebels with a 4-games-to-none sweep.  In the team's first ever league final, the Cobras found themselves up against the Amherstview Jets.  After a long and hard-fought battle, the Jets had enough fuel left to win game 7 and the series 4-games-to-3.

On May 28, 2009, it was announced the Colborne Cobras would move to Port Hope to fill the void left by the OJHL's Port Hope Predators moving to Trenton and became the Port Hope Panthers.

The Panthers were the league champions for the 2014/15 season and  came up short against the Essex 73's during the Clarence Schmalz finals. In 2015/16 they repeated as the league champion and repeated their run to the CSC finals only to have Ayr Centennials claim the title.  This made the Panthers the final Empire B Junior C champions.  On 2016/17 the league became members of the Provincial Junior Hockey League.  In the first season of the PJHL the Panthers were the Tod Division Champions and made a playoff run the league finals.  The finals was a rematch with Ayr Centennials who defended their CSC title.

Season-by-season results

Clarence Schmalz Cup appearances
2015: Essex 73's defeated Port Hope Panthers 4-games-to-3
2016: Ayr Centennials defeated Port Hope Panthers 4-games-to-none
2017: Ayr Centennials defeated Port Hope Panthers 4-games-to-2

Notable alumni
Justin Williams

References

External links
https://porthopepanthers.pjhlon.hockeytech.com/

Empire Junior C Hockey League teams